Dąbrówka-Marianka  is a village in the administrative district of Gmina Zgierz, within Zgierz County, Łódź Voivodeship, in central Poland.

The village has a population of 40.

References

Villages in Zgierz County